= ZippO =

- Born: Ilya Semyonovich Lapidus; March 7, 1998 (age 28); Nikolaev, Ukraine
- Origin: Ukrainian
- Genres: Rap; hip-hop; pop; rap rock; alternative hip hop
- Occupations: Singer-songwriter, rap artist, hip-hop artist, dota rapper
- Years active: 2013–н.в

Ilya Semyonovich Lapidus (Ukrainian: Ілля Семенович Лапідус, Russian: Илья Семёнович Лапидус; born March 7, 1998) is a Ukrainian singer, songwriter, rap and hip hop artist, better known as ZippO.

== Biography ==
Lapidus was born on March 7, 1998, in the Ukrainian city of Nikolaev. The family moved to Kyiv, where he still lives. He began to engage in creativity in childhood. He wrote his first song at the age of 10.

At the age of 14, while still a schoolboy, he took the pseudonym ZippO (after the brand of lighters) and released a new song that became popular on the Internet.

In 2013, when Lapidus was 15 years old, he released his first album, Unforgettable.

== Discography ==
- 2013 — Незабываемо (Unforgettably)
- 2014 — Фитиль (Wick)
- 2021 — Фитиль-2 (Wick-2)
